This Path Tonight is the sixth solo studio album by British singer-songwriter Graham Nash, released on 15 April 2016. It is his first studio album in fourteen years.

Background
When he wrote the tunes for This Path Tonight, Nash's separation from his wife Susan after 38 years of marriage was weighing most heavily on his mind. As he stated about the new album: "This Path Tonight is my emotional journey at this point in my life. [...] Many changes are happening and, as a musician, I'm trying to find the courage to face my future and grab a hold of it. [...] My producer [former Springsteen/Maria McKee sideman] Shane Fontayne and I wanted to make a funkier, more intimate feeling and started the album with the song "This Path Tonight"."

Nash also stated: "What a pleasure it was recording this album. Shane Fontayne and I had written 20 songs in a month and recorded them in eight days. I felt comfortable on day one even though I'd never met some of the musicians before that moment. Shane, who produced the album, put together a great band: Todd Caldwell (Hammond organ), Jay Bellerose (drums, percussion), Jennifer Condos (bass), Patrick Warren (piano), Shane Fontayne (guitars). My music has a different feel to my earlier albums although I hear echoes of each one. This journey of mine was one of self-discovery, of intense creation, of absolute passion. Enjoy!"

Release
On 22 January 2016, Nash announced the forthcoming release on 15 April 2016 of his new studio album entitled This Path Tonight (his first collection of new songs in fourteen years) and shared the title track from it through the MOJO magazine's website.

On 4 February 2016, Rolling Stone magazine's website exclusively unveiled the reflective song "Encore", the tender tune that wraps up Nash's new album.

Track listing
All songs written by Graham Nash and Shane Fontayne.

Personnel 
 Graham Nash – lead vocals, acoustic guitar, harmonica
 Todd Caldwell – Hammond organ
 Patrick Warren – acoustic piano, keyboards  
 Shane Fontayne – acoustic guitar, electric guitars, backing vocals, producer, mixing 
 Jennifer Condos – bass guitar 
 Jay Bellerose – drums, percussion
 Shane Barakan – backing vocals 
 Cynthia Bass – backing vocals 
 Arnaé Batson – backing vocals 
 Brenda Lee Eager – backing vocals 
 Kevin Madigan – recording, mixing 
 Bernie Grundman – mastering at Bernie Grundman Mastering (Hollywood, California)
 Josh Gonzales – guitar technician 
 Kevin O'Connor – drum technician 
 Brian Porizek – art direction, design 
 Amy Grantham – photography 
 Cree Miller and Donald Miller – management

Charts

References

2016 albums
Graham Nash albums